Cubena is a genus of moths of the family Noctuidae. This specific genus of moths is known to display dots on their wings.

References
Natural History Museum Lepidoptera genus database

Plusiinae